Delia's Gone may refer to:

 Delia's Gone (film), an American-Canadian drama film
 "Delia's Gone", a number of songs inspired by the murder of Delia Green